Innan jag kände dig is the third studio album by the Swedish singer-songwriter Melissa Horn, released on 14 September 2011, by Sony/Svedala. It was produced by Ola Gustafsson.

Track listing

Charts

References

2011 albums
Melissa Horn albums